Neisser is a German surname. Notable people with the surname include:

Albert Ludwig Sigesmund Neisser (1855–1916), German physician
Kersten Neisser (born 1956), German rower
Ulric Neisser (1928–2012), American psychologist

See also
Nysa (disambiguation)

German-language surnames